David Bach is a professional poker player, and the winner of the $50,000 World Championship H.O.R.S.E. event at the 2009 World Series of Poker. Bach defeated John Hanson heads-up after a record breaking marathon final table that lasted 20 hours and 492 hands.

At the 2017 WSOP Bach won two more bracelets in mixed events. First he won the $1,500 Dealers Choice event, then added the $10,000 H.O.R.S.E. Championship.

In his WSOP career, Bach has 31 cashes, including thirteen final tables. He has previously finished runner-up in three WSOP bracelet events.  As of 2017, Bach's total live tournament winnings exceed $3,650,000.

Bach has won three major online tournament titles, constituting the "Triple Crown".

Bach is a graduate of the University of Georgia with a degree in Psychology.

World Series of Poker Bracelets

Notes

American poker players
World Series of Poker bracelet winners
Living people
Year of birth missing (living people)